Four-time defending champion Yui Kamiji and her partner Diede de Groot defeated Sabine Ellerbrock and Lucy Shuker in the final, 6–1, 6–1 to win the ladies' doubles wheelchair tennis title at the 2018 Wimbledon Championships.

Kamiji and Jordanne Whiley were the four-time reigning champions, but Whiley did not participate due to maternity leave.

Seeds

  Diede de Groot /  Yui Kamiji (champions)
  Marjolein Buis /  Aniek van Koot (semifinals)

Draw

Finals

References

Sources
WC Women's Doubles

Women's Wheelchair Doubles
Wimbledon Championship by year – Wheelchair women's doubles